The 1988 Oregon Ducks football team represented the University of Oregon during the 1988 NCAA Division I-A football season. Playing as a member of the Pacific-10 Conference (Pac-10), the team was led by head coach Rich Brooks, in his twelfth year, and played their home games at Autzen Stadium in Eugene, Oregon. They finished the season with a record of six wins and six losses (6–6 overall, 3–5 in the Pac-10).

Schedule

Personnel

References

Oregon
Oregon Ducks football seasons
Oregon Ducks football